Simon John Roberts (born 26 January 1971) is a British businessman, and the chief executive officer (CEO) of Sainsbury's since 1 June 2020, having previously been 
retail operations director. He is a former managing director of Boots UK.

Early life
He was born in Croydon, and brought up in South London, attending Purley Sixth Form College.

Career
He started his career working for Marks & Spencer (M&S) aged 16. He was at M&S for fifteen years, becoming a senior manager in 1998.

Boots UK
He joined Boots UK in 2003 as regional director of the south region. He was the joint chief operating officer from 2011, with Ken Murphy. He became managing director of Boots UK (health and beauty) on 1 October 2013, with Ken Murphy (from Cork) becoming managing director of Boots International.

Roberts left Boots in June 2016 "to pursue new opportunities".

Sainsbury's 
In September 2016, it was announced that he would be joining Sainsbury's as retail and operations director.

In January 2020, he was appointed CEO effective 1 June 2020, following the impending retirement of Mike Coupe. Roberts also became the CEO of Argos.

Personal life
He works with Business in the Community.

References

External links
 Corporate website

1971 births
Living people
British business executives
Businesspeople in the pharmaceutical industry
English businesspeople in retailing
People from Purley, London
Businesspeople from London
Pharmaceutical industry in the United Kingdom